Barnówko  is a village in the administrative district of Gmina Dębno, within Myślibórz County, West Pomeranian Voivodeship, in north-western Poland. 

The Christian Berneuchen Movement was born in the 1920s in Berneuchen in the New March (Frankfurt Region). The founders, meeting annually on the Berneuchen Manor, worked to give to spiritual life a greater and more perfect concrete form, in order to throw off the influence of liberal theology. In 1926 the circle published the Berneuchener Buch (Berneuchen Book), written by Karl Bernhard Ritter, Wilhelm Stählin,  and Wilhelm Thomas. Today the Berneuchen societies include Berneuchener Dienst, Evangelische Michaelsbruderschaft and Gemeinschaft Sankt Michael, its current centre, the Berneuchen House (Berneuchener Haus) is in the Kirchberg convent.

The village has a population of 290.

References

Villages in Myślibórz County